Anemic Cinema or Anémic Cinéma is a 1926 Dada/surrealist experimental film by Marcel Duchamp (credited to his alter ego, Rrose Sélavy), made in collaboration with Man Ray and Marc Allégret.

The seven-minute film is composed of alternating static camera shots of spinning animated drawings disks — which Duchamp called Rotoreliefs — inscribed with puns and alliterations in French. The text, which spirals in a counterclockwise motion, suggests erotic scenarios and the words, if read aloud, produce repetitive patterns of sounds that lead to scatological or obscene associations in reference to pulsating human sexual activity. To make Anémic Cinéma, Duchamp filmed painted designs he made on flat cardboard circles while they spun on a phonograph turntable. When spinning, the flat disks appeared three-dimensional.

The film premiered in a private screening in Paris in August 1926 and was acquired by MoMA in 1938, the first Duchamp work to enter a museum.

Duchamp had a commercial printer run off 500 sets of six of the designs and set up a booth at a 1935 Paris inventors' show to sell them. The venture was a financial disaster, but some optical scientists thought they might be of use in restoring three-dimensional sight to people with one eye.

History

Duchamp first showed Anemic Cinema at a private screening for friends in Paris on August 30, 1926. He brought the film on a trip to New York later that year, where he held another private screening at the Fifth Avenue Playhouse on December 22, 1926, and another at Miles Studio in early 1927.

Artist Hans Richter acquired a print of the film and gave it its public debut in 1929, screening it at the Film und Foto exhibition in Stuttgart. New York art dealer Julien Levy obtained another print and screened it at his gallery in 1936 and 1937. The Museum of Modern Art (MoMA) acquired a print from Duchamp in 1938; this was the first of Duchamp's works to enter a museum collection.

The film gained recognition in the 1930s and 1940s as Richter's copy circulated to film clubs in Europe, and MoMA's copy was lent to museums and universities around North America.

Rotoreliefs texts
"Bains de gros thé pour grains de beauté sans trop de bengué." (Bengay was invented in France by Dr. Jules Bengué)
"L'enfant qui tète est un souffleur de chair chaude et n'aime pas le chou-fleur de serre-chaude." 
"Si je te donne un sou, me donneras-tu une paire de ciseaux?"
"On demande des moustiques domestiques (demi-stock) pour la cure d'azote sur la Côte d'Azur." 
"Inceste ou passion de famille, à coups trop tirés."
"Esquivons les ecchymoses des Esquimaux aux mots exquis."
"Avez-vous déjà mis la moëlle de l'épée dans le poêle de l'aimée?" 
"Parmi nos articles de quincaillerie paresseuse, nous recommandons le robinet qui s'arrête de couler quand on ne l'écoute pas."
"L'aspirant habite Javel et moi j'avais l'habite en spirale."

See also
 List of works by Marcel Duchamp
 8 × 8: A Chess Sonata in 8 Movements

Notes and references
Notes

References

External links
 Anémic Cinéma at IMDB
 Anémic Cinéma film at Ubuweb
  Animated display of Duchamp's Rotoreliefs at Aqualoop

1926 films
Marcel Duchamp works
French silent short films
French black-and-white films
1920s French films